Pestka may refer to:

An informal name of the Poznań Fast Tram
"Pestka" mall in Piątkowo, Poznań
, a 1995 Polish film
Pestka (surname)

See also